The Tribes of Galway were 14 merchant families who dominated the political, commercial and social life of the city of Galway in western Ireland between the mid-13th and late 19th centuries. They were the families of Athy, Blake, Bodkin, Browne, Darcy, Deane, Font, French, Joyce, Kirwan, Lynch, Martyn, Morris and Skerritt. Of the 14 families, 12 were of Anglo Norman origin, while two — the Darcy (Ó Dorchaidhe) and Kirwan (Ó Ciardhubháin) families — were Normanised Irish Gaels.

History

The Tribes were merchant families who prospered from trade with continental Europe. They dominated Galway's municipal government during the medieval and early modern eras.

The Tribes distinguished themselves from the Gaelic peoples who lived in the hinterland of the city. Many of these families spoke Irish as a second or even first language. However, the feared suppression of their common faith joined both groups together as Irish Catholics after the Irish Rebellion of 1641.  During the Irish Confederate Wars (1641–1653), Galway took the side of the Confederate Catholics. Following the Cromwellian conquest of Ireland, the English government punished the Tribes. Galway was besieged and after it surrendered in April 1652, the Tribes had to face the confiscation of their property by the New Model Army.

The Tribes lost much of their power within Galway city after English Parliamentarians took over the Galway Corporation in 1654. Cromwell's forces referred to them by the derogatory name, "The Tribes of Galway", which the families later adopted as a mark of defiance.

Galway's urban elite gained a restoration of some of their power during the reign of the King Charles II (1660–1685) and his successor James II. However, Jacobite defeat in the War of the Two Kings (1689–91), marked the end of the Tribes' once overwhelming political influence on the life of the city. Power passed to the small Protestant population. Garrison members of the Tribes who owned land in Galway and Mayo were protected by the advantageous surrender provisions that were signed on 22 July 1691.

Notable members

Athy
 John Athy (fl. 1426-1438), Sovereign of Galway
 Margaret Athy (fl. 1508), founder of the Augustinian Friary of Forthill

Blake
 John Blake fitz William, third Mayor of Galway, 1487–1488
 Captain James "Spanish" Blake, fl. 1588–1635, spy and purported assassin of Red Hugh O'Donnell
 Joaquín Blake y Joyes, (1759–1827), Spanish military officer who served with distinction in the French Revolutionary and Peninsular wars

Bodkin
 John Bodkin fitz Richard, Mayor of Galway, 1518–19
 Dominick Dáll Bodkin, mass murderer, executed 8 October 1740
 Manuel Antonio Flórez Maldonado Martínez Ángulo y Bodquín, admiral in the Spanish navy and viceroy of New Granada (1776 – 1781) and New Spain (1787 – 1789).
 John Bodkin (died 1710), Roman Catholic Warden of Galway. After his death, his body was said to have been the subject of a miracle because it was thought to have not decayed
 Michael Bodkin (c.1888–1900), inspiration for Michael Furey in James Joyce's short story "The Dead"

Browne
 Geoffrey Browne (died 1668), Irish Confederate lawyer and politician
 Mary Bonaventure Browne (before 1610 – after 1670), Poor Clare and historian, 
 John Browne, 1st Marquess of Sligo
 Garech Browne (1939-2018), patron of Irish arts and one-time manager of The Chieftains

Darcy (Ó Dorchaidhe)
 James Riabhach Darcy, Mayor of Galway, 1602–1603.
 Patrick Darcy (1598–1668), Catholic Confederate and lawyer who wrote the constitution of Confederate Ireland
 Patrick Darcy (1725–1779), mathematician and soldier

Deane
 Edmond Deane, 18th Mayor of Galway, 1502–1504

Font (ffont)
 Geoffrey Font (1709–1814), centenarian

French (ffrench)
 Christopher French, (fl. c. 1650-c.1713), theologian
 Seán an tSalainn French (1489–1546), Mayor of Galway, 1538–1539
 Arthur French, 1st Baron de Freyne
 Patricio French (b. 1742-?) Spanish nobleman, merchant and politician
 Conrad O'Brien-Ffrench (1893–1986), artist and secret agent,

Joyce
 Henry Joyce, Mayor of Galway, 1542–1543
 Richard Joyce (c. 1660 – c. 1737), creator of the Claddagh Ring
 Patrick Weston Joyce (1827 – November 1914) historian, writer, and music collector
 Jack Joyce

Kirwan (Ó Ciardhubháin)
 William Ó Ciardhubháin, founder of the merchant family
 Dominick Kirwin (fl. 1642–1653?), Irish Confederate
 Joseph W. Kirwan (1796–1849), first president of Queen's College, Galway
 Magdalen Kirwan (c.1830–1906), Sister of Mercy and manager of St. Vincent's Industrial School, Goldenbridge 
 Richard Kirwan (1733–1812), president of the Royal Irish Academy
 Risteárd Buidhe Kirwan (1708–1779), soldier and duellist
 Sarah Annette Kirwan (d. 1913), first wife of Sir Edward Carson, Ulster Unionist leader
 Laurence P. Kirwan (1907-1999), KCMG, Egyptologist and archeologist; head of Royal Geographical Society
 James Kerwin  (b. 1973), Irish-American film director
Louis Kirwan (actor) (b. 2012)

Lynch
 Anthony Lynch (c. 1576-after 1636), Dominican and Barbary captive
 Christopher Lynch (fl. 1601–1604), Mayor of Galway
 Dominick Dubh Lynch (died 1508), second Mayor of Galway
 Germyn Lynch (fl. 1441–1483), merchant and entrepreneur
 Isidore Lynch (1755–1841), soldier
 Jean-Baptiste Lynch (1749–1835), Mayor of Bordeaux and a peer of France
 John Lynch (1599?–1677?), historian and Archdeacon of Tuam
 Maire Lynch (fl. 1547), Countess of Clanricarde
 Patrick Lynch (Argentina) (1715-1789) ancestor of Che Guevara
 Thomas Kerr Lynch (1818–91), explorer

Martin (Ó Máirtín)
 Edward Martyn (1859–1923), political and cultural activist
 Francis Martin (1652–1722), Augustinian priest
 Mary Gabriel Martyn (1604–1672), abbess of the Poor Clares of Galway.
 Mary Letitia Martin (1815–1850), writer
 Peter Martin (STP) (died 1645), preacher
 Richard Martin (1754–1834), founder of The Society for the Prevention of Cruelty to Animals.
 Violet Florence Martin, (1862–1915), author

Morris
 Andrew Morris, Mayor of Galway, 1588–1589
 Lieutenant-Colonel Hon. George Henry Morris, 1872–1914, commanding officer of the Irish Guards
Michael Morris, Baron Morris (1826–1901), judge and Privy Counsellor
Martin Morris, 2nd Baron Killanin (1867–1927), politician
 Michael Morris, 3rd Baron Killanin (1914–99), sixth president of the International Olympic Committee 1972–80
 Redmond Morris, 4th Baron Killanin (born 1947), filmmaker
 Mouse Morris (born 1951), racehorse trainer and former jockey

Skerrett
 John Skerrett (c.1620–c.1688), preacher and missionary
 Nicholas Skerrett (died 1583), archbishop of Tuam

Modern use
Similar to the nicknames used for other Irish counties, Galway city and county and its people are known as the tribesmen. This nickname is derived from this term.

The tribes also lend their names to 14 of the roundabouts in or around the boundaries of Galway city. The roundabouts are signposted on navy blue signs containing the tribe's name in the Irish language.

See also 

 Seven Noble Houses of Brussels
 Bourgeois of Brussels
 Bourgeois of Paris
 Bourgeoisie of Geneva

References

Bibliography
"History of Galway", James Hardiman, Galway, 1820.
Old Galway, Maureen Donovan O'Sullivan, 1942.
Henry, William, Role of Honour:The Mayors of Galway City 1485–2001Galway, 2002. 
Martyn, Adrian, The Tribes of Galway:1124–1642, Galway, 2016.

External links

History of Galway (city)
Irish families